The 1988 United States Senate election in New Mexico took place on November 8, 1988. Incumbent Democrat U.S. Senator Jeff Bingaman won re-election to a second term.

General election

Candidates 
 Jeff Bingaman (D), incumbent U.S. Senator first elected in 1982
 Bill Valentine (R), New Mexico State Senator

Results

See also 
  1988 United States Senate elections

References

External links 
 Senate's website

New Mexico
1988
United States Senate